Historical metrology is the science that is dealing with the fundamental units of measurement, systems of units formerly in use in various countries, and the development of monetary units throughout their history.

Antiquarianism movement
The interest in historical metrology began with the early antiquarianism movement in Europe during 16th and 17th centuries, when studies of the measurement systems in various ancient cultures became common, e.g. De Mensuris et ponderibus Romanis et Graecis, published in 1533 by Georgius Agricola (1494–1555). From the late 18th century and throughout the 19th century a plethora of books, with the aims to collate and clarify the relationships between different measurement systems and compile systems used in ancient cultures as well as in modern time, were published.

Research efforts
Research efforts were later also used to investigate measurement system in certain cultures or countries. Here it is appropriate to mention Hultsch, who published two monumental works, Griechische und römische Metrologie (1862) and Metrologicorum scriptorium reliquiae, collegit, recensuit, partim nunc primum edidit Fridericus Hultsch (1864/66).

Other scholars producing notable work include:
 Aravaca y Torrent  (Spain, 1867),
 Balbin  (Argentina, 1881), 
 Petrie (London, 1883), 
 Falkman  (Sweden, 1884/85),
 Ferrand (Portuguese Territories of the Indian Ocean, 1920),
 Hinz (Islamic world, 1955),
 Wu  (China, 1957), 
 Skinner (Britain, 1967),
 Rasmussen (Denmark, 1967),
 Zupko (Britain, France and Italy, 1968–90), 
 Pankhurst (Ethiopia, 1969/70),
  (Shostyin) (Russia, 1975),
 Witthöft (Germany, 1979-1994), 
 Bogdán (Hungary, 1990), 
 Charbonnier (France, 1990-2006),
 Donaldson (Oman, 1994),
 Petersen  (Denmark, 2002),
 Grönros et al. (Finland, 2003),
 Seabra Lopes  (Portugal, 1998-2005), and
 Connor and Simpson  (Scotland, 2004).

Published reports
For some countries, principal divisions of executive governments have published reports that compile formerly used weights and measures. For example, this has been done for Bolivia, Great Britain, Costa Rica, Mexico, Portugal, Spain, Tanzania and the United States. In 1954, 1955, and 1966, the United Nation compiled reports that were aimed at giving an overview of the non-metric units then in use in different parts of the world. In 2018, the first of three volumes of the book "Encyclopaedia of Historical Metrology, Weights, and Measures", was published. The book addresses the myriad units of measurement that have arisen through the ages, from weights used by ancient cultures to the scientific units of the modern world.

Representatives
Among the representatives of historical metrology since the second half of the 20th century may be mentioned, among others Chengluo Wu, Florian Huber, Harald Witthöft, István Bogdán, Jan Gyllenbok, Jean-Claude Hocquet, Luís Seabra Lopes, Pierre Charbonnier, Richard Keir Pethick Pankhurst, Rolf C A Rottländer, Ronald Edward Zupko and Walther Hinz.

References